The following is a list of notable deaths in January 1995.

Entries for each day are listed alphabetically by surname. A typical entry lists information in the following sequence:
 Name, age, country of citizenship at birth, subsequent country of citizenship (if applicable), reason for notability, cause of death (if known), and reference.

January 1995

1
Wilhelm Altar, 94, Austrian theoretical physicist and magneto ionic theory pioneer.
Jack Birney, 66, Australian politician.
Bill Bryant, 88, Australian cricketer.
Warren Caro, 87, American theater executive
Ted Hawkins, 58, American singer-songwriter.
Nina Leen, Russian-born American photographer for Life
J. Miller Leavy, 89, American prosecuting lawyer who was the first attorney in the United States to achieve a murder conviction with exclusively circumstantial evidence
Ralph W. Nicholson, 78, American civil servant, military officer, and business executive
Jess Stacy, 90, American jazz pianist who played with Benny Goodman.
Jack G. Thayer, 72, American radio executive and disc jockey.
Ralph E. Van Norstrand, 57, American politician who was Republican Speaker of the Connecticut House of Representatives
Arthur Earl Walker, 87, Canadian-American neurosurgeon, neuroscientist and epileptologist.
Fred West, 53, English serial killer, suicide.
Eugene Wigner, 92, Hungarian physicist Nobel Prize in Physics laureate, pneumonia.

2
Hulbert Aldrich, 87, American banking executive who led the New York Trust Company
Ephraim Amu, 95, Ghanaian composer, musicologist and teacher.
Joe Balsis, 73-74, American professional pool player.
Siad Barre, 84-85, Somalian military leader and statesman, 3rd President of Somalia, heart attack.
Don Elston, 65, American baseball player.
Tun Mustapha, 76, Malaysian politician and Chief Minister of Sabah
Nancy Kelly, 73, American actress, diabetes.
Keith McDaniel, 38, American principal dancer with the Alvin Ailey American Dance Theater and on Broadway
Manuel Rivera, 67, Spanish painter
Henry Graham Sharp, 77, British figure skater and world champion in 1939.

3
Ollie Bejma, 87, American Major League Baseball infielder (Chicago White Sox, St. Louis Browns).
Philip Burton, 86, Irish Fine Gael politician, farmer and auctioneer.
Al Duncan, 67, American blues drummer
Mickey Haefner, 82, All American baseball player.
Roland Harrah III, 21, American film and television child actor, musician, and artist, suicide.
Arne Hestenes, 74, Norwegian journalist and author.
Byron MacGregor, 46, Canadian news anchor and news director.<ref>{{cite web|url=https://apnews.com/article/55c006387a28a9ea21cf6fa253100827 |title=DETROIT (AP) _ Byron MacGregor, a veteran TV and radio journalist whose pro-U.S. recording The Americans" got wide air play in the 1970s, died Tuesday of pneumonia. He was 46. |publisher=The Associated Press |date= |access-date=January 1, 2021}}</ref>
Robert Marquis, 67-68, German-American architect and academic, complication during surgery 
Robert Nesbitt, 88, English theatre director, theatrical producer and impresario.
Edward Nugent, 90, American actor, writer, and director.
Andrija Puharich, 76, American physician.
Robley C. Williams, 86, pioneering American biophysicist and virologist.

4
Naomi Amir, 63, American-Israeli pediatric neurologist.
Ramón Artigas, 86, Spanish swimmer and Olympic athlete.
Vladas Drėma, 84, Lithuanian historian.
Dorothy Granger, 83, American actress, cancer.
Harry Gumbert, 85, American baseball player.
Jim Lee Howell, 80, American football player and coach for the NFL's New York Giants.
Robert Latham, 82, British editor, scholar, and Pepys Librarian.
Eduardo Mata, 52, Mexican conductor and composer, plane crash.
Valery Nosik, 54, Soviet/Russian actor.
Victor Riesel, 81, American newspaper journalist and columnist, heart failure.
Heshmat Sanjari, 77, Iranian conductor and composer.
Brooks Stevens, 83, American graphic and industrial designer.
Sol Tax, 87, American anthropologist who founded the academic journal Current Anthropology.

5
Semi Joseph Begun, 89, German-American engineer and inventor.
Somerset de Chair, 83, English author, politician, and poet.
Victor Mitchell, 71, American bridge player.
Ben Rich, 69, American engineer and the second Director of Lockheed's Skunk Works from 1975 to 1991, esophageal cancer.
Mansour Sattari, 46, Iranian Air Force leader, plane crash.
Kiyoo Wadati, 92, Japanese seismologist.

6
Robert Abajian, 62, American fashion designer and fashion industry executive.
Paul-Émile Allard, 74, Canadian provincial politician.
Philip Brady, 101, Irish Fianna Fáil politician.
Tor Burman, 73, Swedish equestrian who competed in the 1956 Summer Olympics.
James Clay, 59, American jazz tenor saxophonist and flutist.
Todor Diev, 60, Bulgarian football player.
Agustín Gaínza, 72, Spanish football player.
Joe Slovo, 68, ANC activist and South African minister of Housing, cancer.

7
Ali Aliyev, 57, Soviet freestyle wrestler of Avar-Dagestani descent.
Harry Golombek, 83, British chess grandmaster, chess correspondent, and author of more than 30 books on chess.
Larry Grayson, 71, English comedian and television presenter.
Arthur Leavins, 77, British violinist who was concertmaster of the Royal Philharmonic Orchestra.
Walter Rand, 75, American Democratic Party politician from New Jersey.
Murray Rothbard, 68, American economist, heart attack.
Art Stoefen, 80, American basketball player.
Ted Tetzlaff, 91, American cinematographer.

8
Hugó Ballya, 86, Hungarian rower who competed at the 1936 Summer Olympics.
Beatrice Burnham, 92, American silent film actress.
Lemuel Diggs, 95, American pathologist who specialized in sickle cell anemia and hematology.
Loulou Gasté, 86, French composer, songwriter.
Madhu Limaye, 72, Indian socialist essayist and activist, particularly active in the 1970s.
Carlos Monzón, 52, Argentine boxer, traffic accident.
Sylvia B. Seaman, 94, American novelist and suffragist.
Cao Tianqin, 74, Chinese biochemist.

9
Óscar Mendoza Azurdia, 77, Guatemalan general and military junta leader.
Jan Bauch, 96, Czech painter and sculptor.
Gordon Bruce, 64, Australian politician.
Peter Cook, 57, English comedian and writer, gastrointestinal bleeding.
Sterling Dow, 91, American classical archaeologist, epigrapher, and professor of archaeology at Harvard University.
Gisela Mauermayer, 81, German discus thrower.
Ralph Merrifield, 81, English museum curator and archaeologist who was director of the Museum of London.
Stig Sjölin, 66, Swedish boxer.
Souphanouvong, 85, Laotian royal prince and Communist leader, 1st President of Laos.
Xie Youfa, 77, Chinese lieutenant general in the People's Liberation Army.

10
Roy Ashton, 85, Australian makeup artist and tenor.
John H. Bloomer, 64, American attorney and politician who served as President of the Vermont State Senate, accident.
Crosby Bonsall, 74, American artist and children's book author and illustrator.
Fred Böhler, 82, Swiss jazz keyboardist and bandleader.
Nicholas Cavaliere, 95, American cinematographer.
Boris Gurevich, 63, Soviet/Russian flyweight Greco-Roman wrestler.
George McNeil, 86, American abstract expressionist painter.
Michael Meinecke, 53, German art historian, archaeologist, and museum director.
Scotty Rankine, 86, Canadian long-distance runner.
Arthur Ruysschaert, 84, Belgian football player.
Roderick Stephens, 85-86, American sailor and yacht designer.
Kathleen Tynan, 57, Canadian-British journalist, author, and screenwriter, cancer.

11
Raf Baldassarre, 62, Italian film actor.
Ignacio Matte Blanco, 86, Chilean psychiatrist and psychoanalyst.
John Gere, 73, English art historian and curator at the British Museum.
Josef Gingold, 85, Russian-American violinist.
Mildred Barry Hughes, 92, American politician who was the first woman elected to the New Jersey Senate.
Onat Kutlar, 58, Turkish writer, journalist, and poet, bomb attack.
Denis Neville, 79, English football player and manager.
Lewis Nixon III, 76, United States Army officer, diabetes.
Peter Pratt, 71, British opera singer and actor.
Roque Esteban Scarpa, 80, Chilean writer, literary critic and scholar.
Hannes Trautloft, 82, German Luftwaffe flying ace during the Spanish Civil War and World War II.
Theodor Wisch, 87, German Waffen-SS general during World War II.
Paul Zumthor, 79, Swiss philologist.

12
Kay Aldridge, 77, American actress, lung cancer.
Tino Carraro, 84, Italian stage, television and film actor.
Henry Cieman, 89-90, Canadian racewalker and Olympian.
Robert R. Coats, 84, American geologist.
Raymond George, 77, American gridiron football player and coach.
Takako Irie, 83, Japanese actress, pneumonia.
Jack Lee, 74, English football player.
George Price, 93, American cartoonist for The New Yorker magazine for six decades.
Kenneth Sterling, 74, American medical doctor and researcher.

13
Johnny Carroll, 57, American rockabilly musician, liver failure.
Richard Causton, 74, British businessman and author on Buddhism.
Max Harris, 73, Australian poet, critic, columnist, commentator, publisher, and bookseller.
Ray Johnson, 67, American artist, suicide.
David Looker, 81, British bobsledder.
Walter Sheridan, 69, American Federal investigator who prosecuted Jimmy Hoffa.
Mervyn Stockwood, 81, Welsh Church of England priest.
Zsigmond Villányi, 45, Hungarian modern pentathlete.

14
Joe Mike Augustine, 83, native leader and historian of the Metepenagiag Mi'kmaq Nation.
Huang Chieh, 93, Taiwanese politician and general.
Mark Finch, 33, English promoter of LGBTQ cinema, suicide.
Alexander Gibson, 68, Scottish conductor.
Barbara Jelavich, 71, American professor of history at Indiana University, cancer.
David Elliot Johnson, 61, American 14th Bishop of Massachusetts in The Episcopal Church.
Daniel Robbins, 62, American art historian, art critic, and curator, cancer.
Stafford Somerfield, 84, British newspaper editor.
Ruby Starr, 45, American rock singer and recording artist, cancer.
Amos N. Wilson, 53, American writer.

15
Jef Bruyninckx, 76, Belgian actor, editor and director.
Cleo Rickman Fitch, 84, American archaeological researcher.
Josef Kemr, 72, Czech actor.
Vera Maxwell, 93, American sportswear and fashion designer.
Vitaly Parkhimovich, 51, Soviet /Russiansport shooter.
Frederick J. Schlink, 103, American consumer rights activist.

16
Abel Cestac, 76, Argentine boxer.
John Charters, 81, New Zealand rower and Olympic medalist.
Paul Delouvrier, 80, French administrator and economist.
Bill Dillard, 83, American jazz trumpeter.
Eric Mottram, 70, British teacher, critic, editor and poet.

17
Evadne Baker, 57, English actress.
Rolf Böger, 86, German politician of the Free Democratic Party.
Éamonn Goulding, 61, Irish hurler and Gaelic football player.
Wilhelm Haferkamp, 71, German politician.
Miguel Torga, 87, Portuguese writer.

18
Kay B. Barrett, 92, Hollywood talent scout and agent known for her impact on Gone with the Wind, stroke.
Adolf Butenandt, 91, German biochemist, recipient of the Nobel Prize in Chemistry.
Clifford Fagan, 83, American basketball player.
Roger Gilson, 47, Luxembourgian cyclist.
Joseph Kagan, Baron Kagan, 79, Lithuanian-British industrialist.
Ron Luciano, 57, American Major League Baseball umpire, suicide.

19
Roy Barratt, 52, English cricketer.
Reinhard Böhler, 49-50, sidecarcross rider and the first-ever Sidecarcross World Championship.
Daryl Chapin, 88, American physicist, best known for co-inventing solar cells.
John Pearson, 3rd Viscount Cowdray, 84, British peer, businessman and polo player.
Hubert Fol, 69, French jazz saxophonist and bandleader.
Hermann Henselmann, 89, German architect.
Gene MacLellan, 56, Canadian singer-songwriter ("Snowbird", "Put Your Hand in the Hand", "The Call"), suicide.
Patricia Teherán Romero, 25, Colombian singer and composer, traffic collision.
Italo Viglianesi, 79, Italian trade unionist politician and syndicalist.

20
Thomas Arbuthnott, 83, New Zealand boxer.
Mehdi Bazargan, 87, 46th Prime Minister of Iran, heart attack.
Garrett Howard, 95, Irish hurler.
Nobuo Kaneko, 71, Japanese actor.
Arthur MacDonald, 75, Australian Army officer and Chief of the General Staff.
Norris Weese, 43, American gridiron football player, bone cancer.

21
Armando Alemán, 90, Spanish fencer.
Russ Bauers, 80, Major League Baseball player.
Kenneth Budd, 69, English mural artist.
Philippe Casado, 30, French professional road bicycle racer.
Alex Groza, 68, American basketball player.
John Halas, 82, Hungarian animator.
Edward Hidalgo, 82, United States Secretary of the Navy in the Carter administration.
Joseph Mruk, 91, American businessman and Republican politician.
Bernard L. Oser, 95, American biochemist and food scientist.
Sidney Slon, 84, American radio and television writer and actor.
John Coyle White, 70, American chairman of the Democratic National Committee.

22
Jerry Blackwell, 45, professional wrestler, pneumonia.
Stuart Davies, 88, British aerospace engineer.
Lawrie Fernandes, 66, Field hockey player.
Henry Gladstone, American radio newscaster and actor, heart failure.
Rose Kennedy, 104, American philanthropist, pneumonia.
Christopher Palmer, 48, British composer.
Giulio Turcato, 82, Italian artist.

23
Donald Collier, 83, American archaeologist, ethnologist, and museologist.
Albertis Harrison, 88, American politician and jurist who was the 59th Governor of Virginia.
Ken Hill, 57, English playwright and director, cancer.
Peter Luke, 75, British writer, editor, and producer.
Carl Mulleneaux, 80, American gridiron football player.
Helen Phillips, 81, American sculptor.
Saul Rogovin, 72, American professional baseball player, bone cancer.
Edward Shils, 84, American sociologist and professor at the University of Chicago.
Egidio Viganò, 74, Italian Roman Catholic priest.

24
Alf Clay, 81, Australian rules footballer.
David Cole, 32, American record producer, meningitis.
Edward Colman, 89, American cinematographer (Mary Poppins, The Absent-Minded Professor, That Darn Cat!).
Leopoldo Máximo Falicov, 61, Argentine theoretical physicist.
Al Hessberg, 78, American college football player and lawyer.
Anton Idzkovsky, 87, Ukrainian football player and manager.
Regina Linnanheimo, 79, Finnish actor and screenwriter.
Victor Reinganum, 87-88, British artist and illustrator.
Kermit Smith Jr., 37, American convicted murderer, execution by lethal injection.

25
George P. Baker, 91, fifth dean of the Harvard Business School.
Fritz Dorls, 84, German far-right politician and former Nazi Party member.
Erich Hof, 58, Austrian football player and coach, lung cancer.
John Smith, 63, American actor (Laramie, Cimarron City, Circus World), cirrhosis.
Suzanne Storrs, 60, American beauty queen and actress.
William Sylvester, 72, American actor (2001: A Space Odyssey, Gemini Man, Gorgo).
Albert W. Tucker, 89, Canadian mathematician.

26
Ole Ålgård, 74, Norwegian diplomat.
Franz Allers, 89, American conductor.
Charles Altemose, 81, American soccer player.
Marcel Bidot, 92, French professional road bicycle racer who won two stages of the Tour de France.
Vic Buckingham, 79, English footballer and manager.
William Cammisano, 80, American mobster and member of the Kansas City crime family, kidney failure.
Louis Heren, 75, British journalist.
Alaric Jacob, 85, British writer.
Bernardo Leighton, 85, Chilian politician, cardiovascular disease.
Gordon Oliver, 84, American actor and film producer.
Geoffrey Parsons, 65, Australian pianist, cancer.
John Vaughan-Morgan, Baron Reigate, 89, British politician.
Cecil Roy, 94, American actress.
Zeng Shaoshan, 80, Chinese politician.
Ian Tomlinson, 58, Australian triple jumper and long jumper.
Pat Welsh, 79, American actress (E.T. the Extra-Terrestrial), pneumonia.

27
Raynald Arseneault, 49, Canadian composer and organist.
Alexis Brimeyer, 48, pretender who claimed connection to various European thrones, AIDS-related complications.
Bob Chandler, 45, American gridiron football player, lung cancer.
Richard A. Moore, 81, American lawyer and communications executive and ambassador, prostate cancer.
Raphael M. Robinson, 83, American mathematician.
Jean Tardieu, 91, French dramatist, artist, and musician.

28
Philip Burton, 90, Welsh theatre director, producer, and teacher.
Aldo Gordini, 73, Racecar driver.
James P. Grant, 72, Canadian-American diplomat, children's advocate, and Director of UNICEF.
Richard L. Roudebush, 77, U.S. Representative from Indiana.
Ferruccio Tagliavini, 81, Italian opera singer.
George Woodcock, 82, Canadian writer, philosopher, essayist and literary critic.

29
Antonio Brivio, 89, Italian bobsledder and racing driver.
Dickie Burnell, 77, English rower and fold medalist.
Guy Clutton-Brock, 88, English social worker and later a Zimbabwean nationalist.
Joseph Aubin Doiron, 72, Canadian politician.
Kuldar Sink, 52, Estonian composer and flautist.
Song Sung-il, 25, South Korean wrestler, stomach cancer.

30
Angela Calomiris, 78, American photographer and secret FBI informant.
Robert Craig, 77, Scottish academic and church leader.
Mumtaz Daultana, 78, Indian politician.
Gerald Durrell, 70, British naturalist, author, and television presenter.
George James, 88, American jazz saxophonist.
Arthur Julian, 71, American television writer and producer (Gimme a Break!, Amen, The Carol Burnett Show'').
Olga Modrachová, 64, Czechoslovak high jumper, pentathlete, long jumper, sprinter and hurdler.
George Poyser, 84, English footballer and manager.

31
George Abbott, 107, American writer, director, and producer, stroke.
Leo Joseph Brust, 79, American Catholic bishop.
Paul Collins, 68, Canadian long-distance runner and Olympic athlete.
Bernard N. Fields, 56, American microbiologist and virologist, pancreatic cancer.
James Johnson, 86, English MP..
Gerhart Lüders, 74, German physicist.
Kerttu Saalasti, 87, Finnish politician.
John Smith, 74, longtime chairman of Liverpool F.C.
George Stibitz, 90, American computational engineer.
James Wilson, 94, American long-distance motorcyclist and author.

References 

1995-01
01